This is a list of cyclones that have significantly affected or made landfall over the coast of Western Australia.

See also

List of tropical cyclones

References
Notes

General

Specific
Hanstrum, Barry. A history of tropical cyclones in the Southwest of Western Australia, 1830–1992. Early days, Vol. 10, pt. 4 (1992), p. 397-407,

External links
 

 List
Cyclones
Cyclones
Cyclones
Western Australia
Cyclones in Western Australia
Disasters in Western Australia
Tropical cyclones